"Cloud 9" is a song by Indigenous Australian musician Baker Boy featuring Australian 
musician Kian. It was released in April 2017 as both artists' debut single. It is credited as the first original rap to be recorded and released in Yolŋu Matha language.

Following its release, Triple J named Baker Boy their Indigenous Unearthed winner, earning him a spot to perform at the 2017 National Indigenous Music Awards.

Reception
Sosefina Fuamoli from The AU Review said "Encompassing a vibrant blend of hip hop and fun lyricism, 'Cloud 9' is a perfect example of the fresh young talent thriving up North." Fuamoli continued saying "'Cloud 9' is Baker Boy's passionate introduction of a tune, while Kian's vocals in the chorus adds extra flair. Rapping in both English and Yolŋu Matha, Baker Boy is a breath of fresh air."

Indigenous Community TV called the song "an example of the real Aussie Hip-hop". Andrea Gavrilovic from MTV Australia called the song "equal parts catchy and ground breaking." The Music AU called the song "an absolute banger".

References

2017 debut singles
2017 songs
Baker Boy songs
Kian (musician) songs
Songs written by Baker Boy
Songs written by Kian (musician)